The U.S. state of Oregon is home to more than 200 breweries and brew pubs that produce a large variety of beer.

History
Many sources credit Swiss-born Henry Saxer and his Liberty Brewery as being Oregon’s first commercial brewery (supposedly opening in 1852); however, the first verifiable record of a brewery in Oregon is an advertisement in the August 5, 1854 issue of The Weekly Oregonian for Charles Barrett's Portland Brewery and General Grocery Establishment.
 1862 – After working at and later owning several smaller breweries, Henry Weinhard purchased and expanded Liberty Brewery which was later renamed City Brewery.
 1914 – Five years before national prohibition was established, the voters of Oregon approved a statewide ban on the manufacture, sale or advertisement of intoxicating liquor.
 1933 – Oregon and the nation ratified the 21st Amendment.
 1985 – Oregon Legislature legalized brewpubs.

According to a 2014 report by the Beer Institute, Oregon had 208 breweries, a number exceeded by only three states – California (with 509 breweries), Washington (251), and Colorado (217).  As of July 2015, Oregon was home to 234 brewing facilities operated by 194 brewing companies. There are also many nanobreweries in Oregon. Many breweries have won nationwide and international acclaim.

Alongside brewing, hops have a historical presence in Oregon.  Hop production in Oregon began in 1867 when William Wells planted his first crop in Buena Vista, Oregon. This grew throughout the 20th century, when Oregon was dubbed the "Hop Center of the World" for its production around Independence, Oregon, in Polk County. Hop production later saw some decline due to mildew and mechanical picking technology; however, Oregon remains the second largest hop producing state in the US.

Oregon State University began planting and experimenting with hops as early as 1893. Dr. Alfred Haunold influenced modern and popular hop varieties through his work with food studies. The Fermentation Science Program established itself in 1995 and further aided the study of hops and brewing at Oregon State, followed by the creation of the Oregon Hops and Brewing Archives in 2013.

The Oregon Brewers Guild was established in 1992 to promote Oregon breweries; it is the second-oldest nonprofit brewer trade association in the United States.

Breweries
The following are some Oregon-based breweries.  The list includes some large brewing companies that have regional or national distribution.  Oregon also has many mid-size and small breweries.  Most of them produce kegs of beer to be served on draft at taverns and restaurants.  Many of them also package their beer in bottles or cans.  Some production breweries have taprooms where patrons can drink the beer that is produced onsite.  And some breweries are brewpubs – full-service restaurants that brew their own beer.

 10 Barrel Brewing Company – bottles, cans, and brewpub locations in Bend and Portland, as well as Boise, Denver, and San Diego; founded in 2006; bought by Anheuser-Busch in 2014.
Agrarian Ales – Eugene; bottles, brewpub, opened in 2012
Alesong Brewing & Blending – Lorane; bottles, tasting room; founded in 2015
 Ancestry Brewing – opened in 2016, brewery and taproom in Tualatin, restaurant in Portland
 Barley Brown's Beer – Baker City – brewpub, and production brewery with taproom; founded in 1998
 Block 15 Brewing Company – Corvallis – bottles; brewpub opened in 2008; production brewery and taproom opened in 2015
 Boneyard Beer – Bend; tasting room; opened in 2010
 Breakside Brewery – bottles; brewpub in Northeast Portland (opened in 2010), brewery and taproom in Milwaukie (2013), and brewpub in Northwest Portland (2017)
 Buoy Beer Company – Astoria; bottles, brewpub; opened in 2014
 Captured by Porches Brewing – Saint Helens
 Cascade Brewing – bottles; two brewpubs in Portland; founded in 1998
 Cascade Lakes Brewing Company – bottles; brewpubs in Redmond and Bend; founded in 1994
Claim 52 Brewing - Eugene; cans, taproom, brewpub; founded in 2012
Coldfire Brewing – Eugene; bottles, cans, brewpub; opened in 2016
 De Garde Brewing – Tillamook; bottles, taproom; opened in 2013
 Deschutes Brewery – Bend, Portland; bottles, brewpubs; founded in 1988
 Double Mountain Brewery – bottles; taprooms in  Hood River and Portland; founded in 2007
Elk Horn Brewing – Eugene; brewpub; founded in 2014
Falling Sky Brewing – Eugene; brewery, multiple taprooms, founded in 2012
Fearless Brewing – Estacada; cans, brewpub, founded in 2003, sold and renamed to Time Travelers Brewing in 2022 
 Fort George Brewery – Astoria; cans, brewpub; opened in 2007
 Full Sail Brewing Company – Hood River; bottles, brewpub; founded in 1987
 Gigantic Brewing – Portland; bottles, brewpub; opened in 2012
 Gilgamesh Brewing – Salem; bottles, brewpub; opened in 2009
 Great Notion Brewing – Portland brewpub, opened in 2016
 Hair of the Dog Brewing Company – Portland; bottles, brewpub; founded in 1993
 Heater Allen Brewing -- McMinnville, lager focused, opened in 2007
 Hop Valley Brewing Company – Eugene, founded in 2009
 Laurelwood Pub and Brewery – brewpub with several locations in Portland; founded in 2001
Little Beast Brewing – Clackamas (brewery); Portland (beer garden); bottles, brewpub; founded in 2017
 Logsdon Farmhouse Ales – Hood River; bottles, taproom; founded in 2011
 McMenamins – a brewpub chain with locations scattered throughout Oregon and Washington; founded in 1983
 Ninkasi Brewing Company – Eugene; bottles, taproom; founded in 2006
Oakshire Brewing – Eugene, bottles, cans, ; founded in 2006
 Old Town Brewing – Portland; bottles and pizzeria brewpub; original restaurant opened in 1974, brewpub opened in 2012
 Ordnance Brewing – Boardman – cans, taproom, opened in 2014
 Pelican Brewing Company – bottles; brewpubs in Pacific City and Cannon Beach, taproom in Tillamook; founded in 1996
 pFriem Family Brewers – Hood River; bottles, brewpub; opened in 2012
Plank Town Brewing – Springfield; bottles, brewpub; founded in 2013
 The Prodigal Son Brewery and Pub – Pendleton – brewpub, opened in 2010
 Rogue Ales – Newport; founded in 1988; bottles, cans; brewpubs in Oregon, Washington, and California
Sam Bond's Brewing Company – Eugene; bottles, taprooms, founded in 2013

So Many Roads Brewery – Denver; brewery, taproom, music venue, and museum; opened in 2020

Stickmen Brewing Company – Lake Oswego; bottles/cans, brewpubs in Lake Oswego and Tualatin, founded in 2013
 Upright Brewing – Portland; opened in 2009; bottles, taproom
Viking Braggot Company – Eugene; bottles, taprooms; opened in 2013
Wayfinder Beer -- Portland; brewpub, opened in 2016
 Widmer Brothers Brewery – Portland; founded in 1984, Widmer Brothers is now part of Craft Brew Alliance
 Wolves & People Farmhouse Brewery – Newberg – bottles, taproom, opened in 2016
 Worthy Brewing – Bend; cans, brewpub; founded in 2013
 Yachats Brewing – Yachats – farm store opened in 2012, added a brewpub in 2015

Closed breweries

 Alameda Brewing Company – Portland; bottles, cans, brewpub; founded in 1996. Closed in 2018.
 BridgePort Brewing Company – Portland; bottles, brewpub; founded in 1984; acquired by the Gambrinus Company in 1995;
Burnside Brewing Company
The Commons Brewery – Portland – cans, taproom, opened in 2011. Closed in 2017.
 Henry Weinhard's, formerly of Portland, is now owned and brewed by SABMiller, although some beers are brewed under contract by Full Sail Brewing Company.  The Weinhard Brewery Complex is now a mixed-use development.
 Tugboat Brewing Company – Portland brewpub, opened in 1996. Closed in 2017.
 Portland Brewing Company – Portland; bottles, brewpub; founded in 1986; bought by Pyramid Breweries in 2004; acquired by Florida Ice and Farm Company in 2012; closed in 2021.

Festivals
The Oregon Brewers Festival the largest gathering of independent craft brewers in the United States.

The Gold Beach Brew & Art Festival is always held the Saturday after Labor Day.  It is the oldest brew festival in southern Oregon and on the Oregon Coast.

Oregon is host to several other beer oriented festivals throughout the year, each with their own unique focus and feel.

Homebrewing 
F.H. Steinbart is a homebrew supply store on SE 12th Avenue in Portland, Oregon. It is the oldest homebrew supply store in the country and helped nurture the vibrant Pacific Northwest craft-brewing scene. President Jimmy Carter signed HR 1337 into law in 1978, which legalized homebrewing at the federal level. In the years that followed, many commercial brewers began as homebrewer customers who were introduced to the company by buying supplies there – the Widmers and McMenamins brothers were customers.

Owner John DeBenedetti helped establish the Oregon Brew Crew in 1980; it is Oregon’s largest active homebrew club and meets monthly in the FH Steinbart warehouse.

Awards

World Beer Cup

Brewery Awards 
(Discontinued in 2018)

Awards

See also 

 Alcoholic beverages in Oregon
 Beer in the United States
 Drug policy of Oregon
 List of breweries in the United States
 List of companies based in Oregon
 List of microbreweries
 Lists of Oregon-related topics
 Oregon wine

References

External links
Metro US article on Portland breweries
Labels from pre-prohibition breweries, from Oregon State Archives
Oregon Brewers Guild
Video on the history of Oregon Brewing  from Oregon Public Broadcasting
Oregon Hops and Brewing Archives from Oregon State University
Brewing Industry in Oregon from Oregon Encyclopedia

 
 
Oregon
Oregon-related lists